Fathollah Khan Akbar (Persian: فتح الله خان اکبر) was an Iranian Prime Minister. He was Minister of Justice in several Iranian Cabinets. He was a representative of Iranian Parliament from Ahwaz. He was the 17th Prime Minister of Iran serving from October 1920 to February 1921 when he was deposed by a Coup by Seyyed Zia'eddin Tabatabaee and Reza Khan.

See also
Qajar dynasty
List of prime ministers of Iran

References

References used

The following reference was used for the above writing: 'Alí Rizā Awsatí (عليرضا اوسطى), Iran in the Past Three Centuries (Irān dar Se Qarn-e Goz̲ashteh - ايران در سه قرن گذشته), Volumes 1 and 2 (Paktāb Publishing - انتشارات پاکتاب, Tehran, Iran, 2003).  (Vol. 1),  (Vol. 2).

1878 births
1967 deaths
People from Rasht
Prime Ministers of Iran
Ministers of Justice of Iran
Deputies of Rasht for National Consultative Assembly
Politics of Qajar Iran
Leaders ousted by a coup
People of Qajar Iran
20th-century Iranian politicians